The Leonard Medal honors outstanding contributions to the science of meteoritics and closely allied fields. It is awarded by the Meteoritical Society.  It was established in 1962 to honor the first President of the Society, Frederick C. Leonard.

Leonard Medal Winners

See also

 List of astronomy awards
 Glossary of meteoritics

References

Astronomy prizes
Meteorite prizes
Awards established in 1962